Ponta Verde is a seaside settlement in the northeastern part of the island of Santiago, Cape Verde. It is a suburb of the city of Calheta de São Miguel, part of the municipality of São Miguel. It is situated on the Praia-Pedra Badejo-Tarrafal Road (EN1-ST02), 1.5 km northwest of the centre of Calheta de São Miguel. In 2010 its population was 1,065.

References

Villages and settlements in Santiago, Cape Verde
São Miguel, Cape Verde
Populated coastal places in Cape Verde